Joseph Warner Murphy (21 December 1892 – 3 July 1977) was a Progressive Conservative party member of the House of Commons of Canada. He was born in Kent County, Ontario and became a farmer and lawyer by career.

He was first elected at the Lambton West riding in the 1945 general election and served for five successive terms in Parliament until he was defeated in the 1962 federal election by Walter Frank Foy of the Liberal party.

External links
 

1892 births
1977 deaths
Canadian farmers
Members of the House of Commons of Canada from Ontario
Lawyers in Ontario
Progressive Conservative Party of Canada MPs